Toh Baat Pakki! is a 2010 Hindi romantic comedy film directed by Kedarh Shinde. The film, produced by Ramesh S Taurani under Tips Music Films, stars Tabu, Sharman Joshi, Vatsal Sheth, Uvika Choudhary and Ayub Khan. It tells the story of a middle class woman in search for a match for her sister. She happens to meet two matches and lands up in a dilemma to choose one. The woman and her sister have different choices. The rest of the film reveals the hilarious chaos created.

The film was released on 19 February 2010, and received mostly mixed reviews from critics.

Plot

Rajeshwari Saxena is a clever middle-class woman who is married to Surinder Saxena. She is currently looking for a groom for her sister Nisha, who she wants to marry a rich, successful boy. She happens to meet Rahul while grocery shopping. He is studying to be an engineer and is also a Saxena. Grabbing the opportunity, she offers him a room in her house. There, Rahul chances to meet Nisha, Rajeshwari's sister. They fall in love (pushed by Rajeshwari), and Rahul agrees to marry Nisha.

The wedding celebrations are underway when Yuvvraaj happens to come to Rajeshwari's house. He has a permanent job and would be getting a house next month. And he is also a Saxena. Upon seeing a better choice of groom for her sister, Rajeshwari tricks Rahul into vacating the room. Yuvvraaj starts staying in the now empty room. He meets Nisha and falls in love with her. Now, the wedding plans have altered slightly. The groom has changed. When Rahul finds out about this, he plans to outwit Rajeshwari at her own game.

Yuvvraaj becomes aware of the situation and steps aside and asks Rajeshwari to accept Rahul. Rajeshwari realises her folly. Rahul and Nisha wed and go on their honeymoon.

Cast

Production
The film was first announced by Uvika Choudhary in September 2008. She had recently starred in Om Shanti Om and later in Summer 2007. She says that she has got a jump-start in Bollywood but the film was delayed and finally released in February 2010. She also added that the cast and crew was already decided by then.

The film stars Tabu who has returned to acting after three years. She was last seen in Cheeni Kum alongside Amitabh Bachchan and later on in a cameo appearance in Om Shanti Om. This created great publicity of the film during production. Tabu was also signed by Sanjay Gupta.

Sharman Joshi is a friend of director Kedarh Shinde, who knew no other actors on the sets. He helped him work with other actors.

Release
The film was actually scheduled to release in the September 2009 but because of the multiplex strike the film was delayed by five months and finally released on 19 February 2010. This proved that Sharman Joshi's only release in 2009 was 3 Idiots.

Toh Baat Pakki failed to do well at the box office upon its release. It performed between 10–15% in the first week. This was a great shock to the public as well as the crew as it was highly publicised. The film along with Click and Aakhari Decision, which were released together, did not perform well. This proved that My Name Is Khan, which was released the previous week, still dominated the Box Office. In the first two-three days Click ruled over Toh Baat Pakki but later Toh Baat Pakki gained collections. The film grossed Rs.  and was declared a flop.

Reception

Reviews
The film received fairly positive reviews though most of them said that the film was an entertainment failure. Nikhat Kazmi of Times of India, who rated the movie 3 on 5, says that the film becomes a must watch as it marks the return of Tabu. He says that the senior, experienced actor chooses light-hearted comedy this time. He appreciates the acting as well as the direction. He says, "Well, Toh Baat Pakki may not be as riveting as the 80s entertainers, yet it rides high on sheer nostalgia. Also, it presents a different kind of cinema in an age that lays great emphasis on high decibel, larger-than-life drama."

Taran Adarsh of IndiaFM, who rates the film 2 on 5, says that the story is good but when the film unfolds itself on the screen, it turns half as interesting. He gives mixed reviews. He says that the first half is catching while the second half loses its essence at times. He praises Tabu, Sharman and Ayub for their performances which he tells that Vatsal and Yuvika haven't done their best. "On the whole", he says, "Toh Baat Pakki has a few interesting moments, but not enough to keep you hooked."

Mayank Shekhar of Hindustan Times, who rates the film 1.5 on 5, gives mainly negative reviews. He tells that the film is mainly for those who love family dramas and emotions. He also adds that the sets and locations were lacking, along with the music. He says that the plot is inappropriate and the film continues on and "Why Tabu, really!" Overall the film received mostly positive reviews and the readers rating was 3.5.

Soundtrack

The soundtrack consists of 10 songs composed by Pritam. OneIndia tells that the music has got mainly Punjabi mix beats like Jis Din and Dil Le Jaa. Taran Adarsh comments that the movie's music is poor except for Jis Din. which was written by Mayur Puri.

References

External links

2010 films
2010s Hindi-language films
Indian comedy films
Films featuring songs by Pritam
2010 comedy films
Hindi-language comedy films